
This is a list of aircraft in alphabetical order beginning with the letters 'Ai' through 'Am'.

Ai–Am

Aichi 

(Aichi Tokei Denki Kabushiki Kaisha - Aichi Watch and Electric Machinery Company Ltd. / Aichi Kokuki Kabushiki Kaisha - Aichi Aircraft Company Ltd.)
 Aichi AB-1
 Aichi AB-2
 Aichi AB-3
 Aichi AB-4
 Aichi AB-5
 Aichi AB-6
 Aichi AB-7
 Aichi AB-8
 Aichi AB-9
 Aichi AB-10
 Aichi AB-11
 Aichi AB-12
 Aichi AB-13
 Aichi AB-14
 Aichi AM-7
 Aichi AM-10
 Aichi AM-15
 Aichi AM-16
 Aichi AM-17
 Aichi AM-19
 Aichi AM-20
 Aichi AM-21
 Aichi AM-22
 Aichi AM-23
 Aichi AM-24
 Aichi B7A Ryusei
 Aichi C4A(Aichi Navy Experimental 13-Shi High-speed Land-based Reconnaissance Aircraft)
 Aichi D1A
 Aichi D2A
 Aichi D3A
 Aichi E2A
 Aichi E3A
 Aichi E8A
 Aichi E10A
 Aichi E11A
 Aichi E12A
 Aichi E13A
 Aichi E16A
 Aichi F1A
 Aichi H9A
 Aichi M6A Seiran
 Aichi M6A1-K Nanzan
 Aichi S1A Denko
 Aichi Experimental Type 15-Ko Reconnaissance Seaplane (Mi-go)
 Aichi Experimental Three-seat Reconnaissance Seaplane
 Aichi Experimental AB-2 Catapult-launched Reconnaissance Seaplane
 Aichi Experimental AB-3 Single-seat Reconnaissance Seaplane
 Aichi Experimental AB-5 Three-seat Reconnaissance Seaplane
 Aichi Navy Experimental 6-shi Night Reconnaissance Seaplane
 Aichi Navy Experimental 7-shi Carrier Torpedo Attacker
 Aichi Navy Experimental 7-shi Reconnaissance Seaplane
 Aichi Navy Experimental 8-shi Reconnaissance Seaplane
 Aichi Navy Experimental 8-shi Carrier Dive Bomber
 Aichi Navy Experimental 9-shi Night Reconnaissance Seaplane
 Aichi Navy Experimental 10-shi Observation Aircraft
 Aichi Navy Experimental 11-shi Carrier Dive Bomber
 Aichi Navy Experimental 11-shi Night Reconnaissance Seaplane
 Aichi Navy Experimental 12-shi Two-Seat Reconnaissance Seaplane
 Aichi Navy Experimental 12-shi Three-Seat Reconnaissance Seaplane
 Aichi Navy Experimental 13-shi Anti-Submarine and Training Flying Boat
 Aichi Navy Experimental 13-Shi High-speed Reconnaissance Aircraft
 Aichi Navy Experimental 16-shi Carrier Torpedo Attacker Ryusei
 Aichi Navy Experimental 16-shi Carrier Reconnaissance Plane Zuiun
 Aichi Navy Experimental 18-shi Night Fighter Denko
 Aichi Navy Experimental 18-shi Reconnaissance Plane Keiun
 Aichi Navy Type 90-1 Reconnaissance Seaplane
 Aichi Navy Type 94 Carrier Bomber
 Aichi Navy Type 96 Carrier Bomber
 Aichi Navy Type 96 Night Reconnaissance Seaplane
 Aichi Navy Type 98 Reconnaissance Seaplane
 Aichi Navy Type 99 Carrier Bomber
 Aichi Navy Type 0 Reconnaissance Floatplane
 Aichi Navy Type 2 Single-seat Reconnaissance Seaplane
 Aichi Navy Type 2 Two-seat Reconnaissance Seaplane
 Aichi Navy Type 2 Training Flying Boat
 Aichi Navy Type 2 Transport
 Aichi Navy Type H Carrier Fighter
 Aichi Navy Carrier Attack Bomber Ryusei
 Aichi Navy Reconnaissance Seaplane Zuiun
 Aichi Navy Special Attack Bomber Seiran
 Aichi Navy Special Attack Training Bomber Nanzan
 Aichi Navy Carrier Torpedo Attacker Ryusei Kai

AIDC 

(漢翔航空工業股份有限公司 - Aerospace Industrial Development Corporation)
 AIDC AT-3 Tzu-Chiang
 AIDC F-CK-1A Ching-kuo
 AIDC F-CK-1B Ching-kuo
 AIDC F-CK-1C Hsiang Sheng
 AIDC F-CK-1D Hsiang Sheng
 AIDC PL-1
 AIDC T-CH-1
 AIDC XC-2
 AIDC XAT-5 Blue Magpie

Aiglon

(Société Aiglon)
 Aiglon Roulier

AII 
(Aviation Industries of Iran)
 AII AVA-505 Thunder
 AII IR-H5
 Zafar 300
 IRGC Shahed 274

AIL 

(Aeronautical Industries of Louisiana, Monroe, LA)
 AIL B-3A
 AIL Express

Aimé-Salmson 

(Emannuel Aimé & Émile Salmson)
 Aimé-Salmson 1909 Autoplane

Air & Space 

(Air & Space Mfg Inc, Muncie, IN)
 Air & Space 18A Heliplane
 Air & Space 18A Flymobil

Air Boss 

(Southern Aircraft Corp)
 Air Boss 1928 Biplane

Air Capital 

(Air Capital Mfg Co.)
 Watkins SL-1

Air Command

(Air Command International, Caddo Mills, TX)
Air Command Commander
Air Command Commander 147A
Air Command Commander Elite
Air Command Commander Side-By-Side
Air Command Commander Sport
Air Command Commander Tandem
Air Command Single Place
Air Command Tandem

Air Copter
(Lherm, France)
Air Copter A3C

Air Creation 
(Air Creation SARL)
 Air Creation GT
 Air Creation GT-BI
 Air Creation Kiss 400 GTE 582
 Air Creation Kiss 450 GTE 582
 Air Creation Mild GTE 582 Float
 Air Creation XP-12 Buggy 582 SL
 Air Creation MILD-GTE 503 SL
 Air Creation MILD-GTE 582
 Air Creation XP-GTE 582 SL
 Air Creation XP-Buggy
 Air Creation Clipper
 Air Creation iXess Clipper 582
 Air Creation XP-17 Clipper 912
 Air Creation Pixel
 Air Creation Racer
 Air Creation Fun Racer
 Air Creation XP Racer
 Air Creation Tanarg
 Air Creation Twin
 Air Creation Skypper
 Air Creation Racer

Air Department
(Admiralty Air Department)
 AD Flying Boat - built by Supermarine
 AD Navyplane - built by Supermarine
 AD Scout - built by Blackburn and by Hewlett and Blondeau
 AD Seaplane Type 1000 - built by J. Samuel White

Air Energy 
 Air Energy AE-1 Silent

Air Est Services 
(Air Est Services, France)
 Air Est Goeland
 Air Est JCD 03 Pelican

Air Force Aircraft Manufacturing Factory 
(Chinese Republic)
 Chu XP-0
 Chu XP-1
 Chu XP-2
 Chu Hummingbird Model A
 Chu Hummingbird Model B
 Chu D-2

Air Leader 

(Air Leader Airplane Co, Floral Park, NY)
 Air Leader 1926 Monoplane

Air Magic Ultralights

(Houston, Texas)
Air Magic Spitfire
Air Magic Spitfire II

Air Nova
(Air Nova (Pty.) Ltd. / Dr. Maitland Reed, J.H. Rautenbach, H.G. Brown & G.P.M. Stege)
 Air Nova Reed Falcon

Air Products Company 

 Air Products Aircoupe

Air Quest International 

(see: Zalazar)

Air Roamer 

(George Maves & Jimmie Watkins, Clover Field, Santa Monica, CA)
 Air Roamer 1928 Monoplane

Air Scooter

 AirScooter II

Air Sports

(Air Sports Aircrafts  Gmbh and Co KG, Wellersen, Germany)
Air Sports AIRector 120

Air Sylphe

(Villereau, Nord, France)
Air Sylphe 447
Air Sylphe Bi 582

Air Tractor 

(Air Tractor Inc (pres: Leland Snow), Olney, TX)
 Air Tractor AT-301
 Air Tractor AT-302
 Air Tractor AT-400
 Air Tractor AT-401
 Air Tractor AT-402
 Air Tractor AT-501
 Air Tractor AT-502
 Air Tractor AT-503
 Air Tractor AT-602
 Air Tractor AT-802

Air Transport
see General-Western

Air-Craft 

(Air-Craft Corp of America, Portland, IN)
 Air-Craft Falcon

Air-Istocrat 

(United States Aircraft Corp, 76 Nelson St, New Brunswick, NJ)
 Air-istocrat SP-7
 Air-istocrat SR-4
 Air-istocrat SR-5

Air-Metal
("Air-Metal Flugzeugbau und Entwicklungs GmbH & Co Betrieb KG)
 Air-Metal AMZ-102T
 Air-Metal AM-C 111

 Air-Row 

(American Aircraft Corp, Chicago, IL)
 Air-Row Arrow B-7

Air-space

 Air-space CTSW

Air-Sport

(Zakopane, Poland)
Air-Sport Aeolus
Air-Sport Ajos
Air-Sport Altus
Air-Sport Buran
Air-Sport Chinook
Air-Sport Daedalus
Air-Sport Euros
Air-Sport Fen
Air-Sport Lahotse
Air-Sport Notos
Air-Sport Notosie
Air-Sport Pasat

 Air-Sud-Ouest 

 Air-Sud-Ouest 1070 Griffon

 Airbet 

(Airbet Serveis Aeronautics, Barcelona, Spain)
 Airbet Girabet Classic
 Airbet Girabet 582
 Airbet Girabet 2
 Airbet Girabet 2 Sport

Airborne Windsports

(Redhead, New South Wales, Australia)
Airborne Edge
Airborne Edge 582 Executive
Airborne Edge X 503 Wizard
Airborne Classic S
Airborne Edge X TS-912
Airborne Edge Streak II XT
Airborne X-Series Classic
Airborne Classic
Airborne Outback
Airborne Redback
Airborne Redback Wizard
Airborne X-Series Redback
Airborne XT
Airborne XT-912 Streak 2
Airborne XT912-SST Tundra
Airborne XT-912 Tundra
Airborne XT-912 Tourer
Airborne XT-912 Outback
Airborne XT-582 Tourer
Airborne XT-582 Tundra
Airborne XT-582 Outback
Airborne T-Lite
Airborne V-Lite
Airborne Sting
Airborne Climax
Airborne Climax C2 13
Airborne Climax C2 14
Airborne Climax C4
Airborne Fun

Airbridge

(Moscow, Russia)
Airbridge Cruiser Suzuki
Airbridge Fregat-Hydro

 Airbus 

(Airbus industrie - part of EADS, now Airbus Group)
 EADS CASA C-295 AEW
 Airbus A220
 Airbus A300
 Airbus A300-600ST
 Airbus A310
 Airbus A310 MRTT
 Airbus CC-150 Polaris Canadian Armed Forces
 Airbus A318
 Airbus A319
 Airbus A319CJ
 Airbus A320
 Airbus A320ceo
 Airbus A320neo
 Airbus A320 family
 Airbus A321
 Airbus A330
 Airbus A330ceo	
 Airbus A330neo
 Airbus A330-302
 Airbus A330 MRTT
 Airbus A330-743L
 Airbus A333
 Airbus A340 
 Airbus A350
 Airbus A350-900
 Airbus A350 XWB
 Airbus A380
 Airbus A400M
 Airbus Beluga
 Airbus BelugaXL
 Airbus Bird of Prey
 Airbus E-Fan
 Airbus E-Fan X
 Airbus Maveric
 Airbus Skylink

Airbus Helicopters
 Airbus Helicopters H120
 Airbus Helicopters H125
 Airbus Helicopters H130
 Airbus Helicopters H145
 Airbus Helicopters H155
 Airbus Helicopters H160
 Airbus Helicopters H175
 Airbus Helicopters H215
 Airbus Helicopters H225
 Airbus Helicopters UH-72A Lakota
 Airbus Helicopters EC160
 Airbus Helicopters AS365
 Airbus Helicopters VSR700 OPV
 Airbus CityAirbus

 Airco 
(Aircraft Manufacturing Company)

 Airco DH.1
 Airco DH.2
 Airco DH.3
 Airco DH.4
 Airco DH.5
 Airco DH.6

 Airco DH.9
 Airco DH.9A
 Airco DH.9C
 Airco DH.10 Amiens
 Airco DH.11 Oxford
 Airco DH.14
 Airco DH.14A
 Airco DH.15
 Airco DH.16
 Airco DH.18

Airconcept

 Airconcept VoWi 10

Aircore

(Aircore Industries)
 Aircore Cadet

Aircorp
(Aircorp Pty. Ltd.) JAWA
 Aircorp B-2N Bushmaster
 Aircorp B-316 Bushmaster
 Aircorp B-460 Bushmaster
 Aircorp B-480 Bushmaster

 AirCoupe 

(AirCoupe Div, Air Products Co Ltd)
 AirCoupe F-1A

 Aircraft Associates 

(Aircraft Associates Inc, Long Beach, CA)
 Aircraft Associates J-2 Cub

 Aircraft Builders 

(Aircraft Builders Co, Coldwater, MI)
 Aircraft Builders Parrot

 Aircraft Builders Club 

(Aircraft Builders Club, Lakewood, Cleveland, OH)
 Aircraft Builders Club 1930 Biplane

 Aircraft Cooperative Mechta 

 Aircraft Cooperative Mechta AC-4 Russia

 Aircraft Designs 

 ADI Bumble Bee
 ADI Condor
 ADI Sportster
 ADI Stallion
 ADI Nova

Aircraft Disposal Company
see:Airdisco

 Aircraft Engineering Corp 

(see Ace)

 Aircraft Engineers 

(Aircraft Engineers Inc., Chicago, IL)
 Aircraft Engineers B-2

Aircraft Industries of Canada

 AIC Super Cheetah

 Aircraft Manufacturing Company 

(Aircraft Mfg Co, (possibly Ft Worth), TX)
 Texas Bullet

 Aircraft Research 

 Aircraft Research BT-11

Aircraft Sales and Parts

 Beaver RX 550 Plus
 Chinook Plus 2

 Aircraft Specialties 

(Aircraft Specialties Co, Saugus, CA)
 Aircraft Specialties Betsa Bird
 Aircraft Specialties Wing Ding

 Aircraft Technologies 

(Aircraft Technologies Inc, Lilburn, GA)
 Aircraft Technologies Acro 1
 Aircraft Technologies Atlantis

 Airdale 

(Airdale Flyer Company)
 Airdale Airdale
 Airdale Avid Plus
 Airdale Backcountry

 Airdisco 
(Aircraft Disposal Company / ADC)
 Airdisco Phi-Phi
 Martinsyde ADC1
 Airdisco Nimbus-Martinsyde
 ADC Variable Camber Monoplane

 Airdrome Aeroplanes 

 Airdrome Bleriot Model XI (0.75:1)
 Airdrome Bleriot Model XI (1:1)
 Airdrome DeHavilland DH-2 (0.75:1)
 Airdrome Dream Classic
 Airdrome Dream Fantasy Twin
 Airdrome Eindecker E-III (0.75:1)
 Airdrome Fokker D-VI (0.75:1)
 Airdrome Fokker D-VII (0.8:1)
 Airdrome Fokker D-VIII (0.75:1)
 Airdrome Fokker DR-1 (1:1)
 Airdrome Fokker DR-1 (0.75:1)
 Airdrome Morane Saulnier L (0.75:1)
 Airdrome Nieuport 11 (0.87:1)
 Airdrome Nieuport 16 (1:1)
 Airdrome Nieuport 17 (1:1)
 Airdrome Nieuport 17 bis (1:1)
 Airdrome Nieuport 24 (1:1)
 Airdrome Nieuport 24 bis (1:1)
 Airdrome Nieuport 25 (1:1)
 Airdrome Nieuport 28 (1:1)
 Airdrome Royal Aircraft Factory SE-5a
 Airdrome Sopwith Baby
 Airdrome Sopwith Camel (1:1)
 Airdrome Sopwith Pup (1:1)
 Airdrome Sopwith Schneider (1:1)
 Airdrome Sopwith Tabloid (1:1)
 Airdrome Taube (0.75:1)

 Aire-Kraft 

(Aire-Kraft Co, Washington, PA)
 Aire-Kraft OHS-111 'Cabin-Aire'

Airfer
(Airfer Paramotores, Paramotores Air-Future, S.L., Pontevedra, Spain)
Airfer Transan
Airfer Bimax
Airfer Titan
Airfer Tornado

Airfisch
(Hanno Fischer founded his design office Fischer – Flugmechanik, and together with his later partner Klaus Matjasic)
 Airfisch 1
 Airfisch 2
 Airfisch 3
 Airfisch 8 (Flarecraft)
Fischer Hoverwing HW20

 Airflow 

(Airflow S.P.R.L.)
 Airflow Twinbee

Airframes Unlimited

(Athens, Texas, United States)
Airframes Unlimited Hyperlite
Airframes Unlimited Skeeter
Airframes Unlimited SS-2 Trainer
Airframes Unlimited Super 103
Airframes Unlimited T-2
Airframes Unlimited T-103

 Airgo 

(Airgo Mfg Co (J Henley), Guthrie, OK)
 Airgo A-1
 Airgo B

Airkraft

(Airkraft Gmbh Leichtflugzeugbau, Beringen, Switzerland)
Airkraft Sunny

 Airline 

(Airline Transportation Co (fdr: L E Hardy), Los Angeles, CA)
 Airline Arrow

 AirLony 

 AirLony Skylane
 AirLony Highlander

Airmak
(Airmak srl.)
 Airmak J4

Airmass Inc.

Airmass Sunburst

 Airmaster 

(Airmaster Helicopters)
 Airmaster H2-B1

 Airmaster 

(Airmaster Inc (pres: Lawrence Matanski), Renton, WA)
 Airmaster Avalon 680
 Airmaster Twin Star 1000
 Airmaster A-1200 Guardian

 Airmax 

(Airmax Construcoes Aeronautica)
 Airmax Sea Max

Airmotive Engineers

(Pontiac Oakland Airport, Pontiac, MI)
Airmotive EOS 001

 Airo 

(Airo Aviation FZ-LLC, Ras Al Khaimah Free Trade Zone, United Arab Emirates)
 Airo 1
 Airo 5

Airplane Alley

(Airplane Alley - Mike Huffman)
 Bede-Huffman BD-8

Airplane Factory, The

(The Airplane factory (Pty) Ltd, Tedderfield Airpark, Eikenhof, Johannesburg South, South Africa)
 Airplane Factory Speedstar 850
 Airplane Factory Sling 2
 Airplane Factory Sling 4

 Airship Development 

 Airship Development AD1

 Airship Manufacturing 

 Sky Sentinel

 Airspeed 
(Airspeed Ltd)

 Airspeed AS.1 Tern
 Airspeed AS.4 Ferry
 Airspeed AS.5 Courier
 Airspeed AS.6 Envoy
 Airspeed AS.8 Viceroy
 Airspeed AS.9
 Airspeed AS.10 Oxford
 Airspeed AS.14
 Airspeed AS.15
 Airspeed AS.16 - number reserved for licence built Fokker F.XXII but never ordered
 Airspeed AS.17 - reserved for licence built Fokker D.XVII
 Airspeed AS.19 - Fokker D.XIX
 Airspeed AS.20 - reserved for licence built Fokker F.XXXVI
 Airspeed AS.21 - Fokker D.XX
 Airspeed AS.22 - reserved for licence built Fokker C.X
 Airspeed AS.23 - reserved for licence built Douglas DC-2
 Airspeed AS.24
 Airspeed AS.27
 Airspeed AS.29 - design tendered to Air Ministry Specification B.1/35, not proceeded with 
 Airspeed AS.30 Queen Wasp
 Airspeed AS.31 - to AM Specification F.35/35, not built
 Airspeed AS.32
 Airspeed AS.33
 Airspeed AS.34
 Airspeed AS.35
 Airspeed AS.36 - AM Specification T.1/37, not built
 Airspeed AS.37 - AM Specification Q.8/37 radio controlled target, not built
 Airspeed AS.38 Queen Wasp
 Airspeed AS.39 Fleet Shadower
 Airspeed AS.40 Oxford
 Airspeed AS.41 Oxford
 Airspeed AS.42 Oxford - specification T.39/37 for the Royal New Zealand Air Force
 Airspeed AS.43 Oxford
 Airspeed AS.44
 Airspeed AS.46 Oxford V
 Airspeed AS.45 Cambridge
 Airspeed AS.47 - military design not built
 Airspeed AS.48 - Night-fighter design abandoned after all work lost in bombing raid
 Airspeed AS.49 - Proposed development of Airspeed Queen Wasp to Specification T.24/40, not built
 Airspeed AS.50 Queen Wasp
 Airspeed AS.51 Horsa MkI
 

 Airspeed AS.54 - Specification TX.3/43
 Airspeed AS.55
 Airspeed AS.56 - fighter design tendered to F.6/42 but turned down
 Airspeed AS.57 Ambassador
 Airspeed AS.58 Horsa Mk II
 Airspeed AS.59 Ambassador Mk.II - unbuilt project
 Airspeed AS.60 Ayrshire - military development of Ambassador to specification C.13/45, ordered but not built
 Airspeed AS.64 - tendered to specification C.26/43
 Airspeed AS.65 Consul
 Airspeed AS.66 - proposal for Ambassador development 
 Airspeed AS.67 - proposal for Ambassador development 
 Airspeed AS.69
 Airspeed LXM1

Airsport

(Airsport SRO, Zbraslavice, Czech Republic)
Airsport Sonata
Airsport Sonet
Airsport Song

 Airtec 

(CASA / Nutanio joint venture)
 Airtec CN-235 (-10 and -100 only)

Airtech Canada

 Airtech Canada DHC-3/1000 Otter
 Airtech Canada DHC-2/PZL-3S Beaver
 Airtech Canada DC-3/2000
 Airtech Canada/PZL Turbo Orlik
 Airtech Canada Skylark

Airtime Products

(Airlie Beach, Queensland, Australia)
Airtime Discovery
Airtime Explorer

Airtrike

(Airtrike GmbH, Berlin, Germany)
Airtrike Eagle 5

 AirUtility 

(AirUtility Cargo Co, North Sacramento, CA)
 AirUtility AU-18
 AirUtility AU-18-150B
 AirUtility AU-27

Airwave Gliders

(Fulpmes, Austria)
Airwave Magic
Airwave Scenic
Airwave Sport
Airwave Ten
Airwave Wave

 Airwings 

(Airwings Inc, New Brunswick, New Jersey)
 Airwings X

 Airworthy 

(Airworthy Airplane Co (George Antolchick & Frederick H Jolly), Chicago, IL)
 Airworthy Terrier

AIS

(Aviatsionnaya Ispitatelnaya Stantsiya)
 AIS Aist
 AIS torpedo carrier

 AISA 

(Aeronáutica Industrial S.A.)
 AISA I-11
 AISA I-11B
 AISA I-115
 AISA IH-51
 AISA H-52
 AISA GN
 AISA HM.1
 AISA HM.5 
 AISA HM.9
 AISA AVD.12
 AISA GP-1 (González Gil)
 AISA HM1-B
 AISA Loring X

Aist

 Aist-123

 AJI 

(American Jet Industries Inc (Pres: Allen E Paulson), Van Nuys, CA)
 AJI Hustler 400
 AJI Hustler 500
 AJI T-610 Super Pinto
 AJI Turbo Star 402

 Akabane 

(Akabane Hikoki Seisakusho - Akabane Aeroplane Manufacturing Works)
 Akabane Kishi No.1 Tsurigi-go Aeroplane
 Akabane Kishi No.2 Tsurigi-go Aeroplane
 Akabane Kishi No.3 Tsurigi-go Aeroplane
 Akabane Kishi No.4 Tsurigi-go Aeroplane
 Akabane Kishi No.5 Tsurigi-go Aeroplane
 Akabane Kishi No.6 Tsurigi-go Aeroplane

 Akaflieg Berlin 

(Flugtechnische Fachgruppe)
 Akaflieg Berlin B1 "Charlotte"
 Akaflieg Berlin B2 "Teufelchen"
 Akaflieg Berlin B3 "Charlotte2"
 Akaflieg Berlin B4 "F.F."
 Akaflieg Berlin B5
 Akaflieg Berlin B6
 Akaflieg Berlin B7 project
 Akaflieg Berlin B8
 Akaflieg Berlin B9 (RLM 8-341)
 Akaflieg Berlin B10
 Akaflieg Berlin B11
 Akaflieg Berlin B12
 Akaflieg Berlin B13

Akaflieg Braunschweig

 Akaflieg Braunschweig SB-1
 Akaflieg Braunschweig SB-02 Brockenhexe
 Akaflieg Braunschweig SB-3
 Akaflieg Braunschweig SB-4
 Akaflieg Braunschweig SB-5 Danzig
 Akaflieg Braunschweig SB-6
 Akaflieg Braunschweig SB-7 Nimbus
 Akaflieg Braunschweig SB-8
 Akaflieg Braunschweig SB-9 Stratus
 Akaflieg Braunschweig SB-10 Schirokko
 Akaflieg Braunschweig SB-11
 Akaflieg Braunschweig SB-12
 Akaflieg Braunschweig SB-13 Arcus
 Akaflieg Braunschweig SB-14

Akaflieg Danzig
(Akafdemischen Fliegergruppe der Technischen Hoch-schule Danzig)
 Akaflieg Danzig Boot Danzig

Akaflieg Darmstadt

Akaflieg Darmstadt D-1
Akaflieg Darmstadt D-2 Pumpelmeise
Akaflieg Darmstadt D-3 Nolleputzchen
Akaflieg Darmstadt D-4 Edith
Akaflieg Darmstadt D-5 Flohschwanz
Akaflieg Darmstadt D-6 Geheimrat
Akaflieg Darmstadt D-7 Margarete
Akaflieg Darmstadt D-8 Karl der Große
Akaflieg Darmstadt D-9 Konsul
Akaflieg Darmstadt D-10 Hessen / Piepmatz
Akaflieg Darmstadt D-12 Roemryke Berge
Akaflieg Darmstadt D-15 Westpreußen
Akaflieg Darmstadt D-16
Akaflieg Darmstadt D-17 Darmstadt
Akaflieg Darmstadt D-18
Akaflieg Darmstadt D-19 Darmstadt II
Akaflieg Darmstadt D-20 Starkenburg
Akaflieg Darmstadt D-22
Akaflieg Darmstadt D-28 Windspiel
Akaflieg Darmstadt D-29b
Akaflieg Darmstadt D-30 Cirrus
Akaflieg Darmstadt D-31
Akaflieg Darmstadt D-32
Akaflieg Darmstadt D-33 (Lippisch / Heinemann DM-1)
Akaflieg Darmstadt D-34
Akaflieg Darmstadt D-36 Circe
Akaflieg Darmstadt D-37 Artemis
Akaflieg Darmstadt D-38
Akaflieg Darmstadt D-39 Mc Hinz
Akaflieg Darmstadt D-40
Akaflieg Darmstadt D-41
Akaflieg Darmstadt D-42
Akaflieg Darmstadt D-43

Akaflieg Darmstadt/Akaflieg München

 Akaflieg Darmstadt/Akaflieg München DM1
 Akaflieg Darmstadt/Akaflieg München DM2
 Akaflieg Darmstadt/Akaflieg München DM3
 Akaflieg Darmstadt/Akaflieg München DM4

Akaflieg Hannover

Akaflieg Hannover AFH-24

Akaflieg Karlsruhe

Akaflieg Karlsruhe AK-1
Akaflieg Karlsruhe AK-5
Akaflieg Karlsruhe AK-5b
Akaflieg Karlsruhe AK-8

Akaflieg Köln

Akaflieg Köln AFK-1

Akaflieg München

Akaflieg München Mü1 Vogel Roch
Akaflieg München Mü2 Münchner Kindl
Akaflieg München Mü3 Kakadu
Akaflieg München Mü4 München
Akaflieg München Mü5 Wastl
Akaflieg München Mü6
Akaflieg München Mü7
Akaflieg München Mü8
Akaflieg München Mü9
Akaflieg München Mü10 Milan
Akaflieg München Mü11 Papagei
Akaflieg München Mü12 Kiwi
Akaflieg München Mü13 Merlin / Atlante
Akaflieg München Mü14
Akaflieg München Mü15
Akaflieg München Mü16
Akaflieg München Mü17 Merle
Akaflieg München Mü18 Meßkrähe
Akaflieg München Mü19
Akaflieg München Mü20
Akaflieg München Mü22
Akaflieg München Mü23 Saurier
Akaflieg München Mü24
Akaflieg München Mü25
Akaflieg München Mü26
Akaflieg München Mü27
Akaflieg München Mü28
Akaflieg München Mü30 Schlacro
Akaflieg München Mü31

Akaflieg Stuttgart

Akaflieg Stuttgart F.1 Fledermaus
Akaflieg Stuttgart fs16 Wipperstertz
Akaflieg Stuttgart fs17
Akaflieg Stuttgart fs18
Akaflieg Stuttgart fs23 Hidalgo
Akaflieg Stuttgart fs24 Phönix
Akaflieg Stuttgart fs25 Cuervo
Akaflieg Stuttgart fs26 Moseppl
Akaflieg Stuttgart fs28 Avispa
Akaflieg Stuttgart fs29 TF
Akaflieg Stuttgart fs31
Akaflieg Stuttgart fs32 Aguila
Akaflieg Stuttgart fs33 Gavilán
Akaflieg Stuttgart fs34 Albatros
Akaflieg Stuttgart fs35
Akaflieg Stuttgart Icaré II

 Akaflieg Wilhelmshaven 

 Akaflieg Wilhelmshaven SD-1 Mini-Sport

 Akasamitra 

(Akasamitra Homebuilt Aircraft Association)
 Akasamitra ST-220

 Akerman 

(John D Akerman, Northland Aviation Co, Minneapolis, MN)
 Akerman JDA-8
 VEF JDA-10M
 Akerman Tailless

 Akers 

(Akers Aircraft, Chicago, IL)
 Akers A-1

 Akin 

(Earl T Akin, Breckenridge, TX)
 Akin AA
 Akin Buckaroo

 Akins 

(Rick Akins)
 Akins Stinger

 Akro 

(Leo Loudenschlager)
 Akro Laser 200

 Akron-Funk 

(see Funk)

Akrotech Aviation

(Akrotech Aviation, Inc, Scappoose, OR)
Giles G-200
Giles G-202

Alaire

 Alaire AL.1 Cacique

 Alamo 

(Alamo Aircraft Corp, San Antonio, TX)
 Alamo 1929 Biplane

Alaparmasee also Mantelli Alaparma Baldo
 Alaparma Tucano

 Albar 

(Lavigne Albar, Mount Pleasant, MI)
 Albar Albarian
 Albar Amphibian

 Albastar 

(Albastar Ltd)
 Albastar A1
 Albastar Apis

 Albatros 

(Albatros Flugzeugwerke G.m.b.H.)
Data from:German Aircraft between 1919 - 1945
 Albatros B.I
 Albatros B.II
 Albatros B.III
 Albatros C.I
 Albatros C.II
 Albatros C.III
 Albatros C.IV
 Albatros C.V
 Albatros C.VI
 Albatros C.VII
 Albatros C.VIII
 Albatros C.IX
 Albatros C.X
 Albatros C.XII
 Albatros C.XIII
 Albatros C.XIV
 Albatros C.XV
 Albatros CLS.I
 Albatros D.I
 Albatros D.II
 Albatros D.III
 Albatros D.IV
 Albatros D.V
 Albatros D.VI
 Albatros D.VII
 Albatros D.VIII
 Albatros D.IX
 Albatros D.X
 Albatros D.XI
 Albatros D.XII
 Albatros Dr.I
 Albatros Dr.II
 Albatros F.2 (Farman III)
 Albatros G.II
 Albatros G.III
 Albatros H 1
 Albatros J.I
 Albatros J.II
 Albatros J.III
 Albatros L 1 B.I DDK
 Albatros L 2 B.II
 Albatros L 3?
 Albatros L 4 G.I
 Albatros L 5 B.III LDD
 Albatros L 6 C.I DM15
 Albatros L 7 (OAW C.I)
 Albatros L 8 C.II
 Albatros L 9 ME
 Albatros L 10 C.III LDDM
 Albatros L 11 G.II
 Albatros L 12 C.IV
 Albatros L 13 (OAW C.II)
 Albatros L 14 C.V
 Albatros L 15 D.I
 Albatros L 16 C.VI
 Albatros L 17 D.II
 Albatros L 18 C.VII
 Albatros L 19 C.VIII
 Albatros L 20 D.III
 Albatros L 21 G.III
 Albatros L 22 D.IV
 Albatros L 23 C.IX
 Albatros L 24 D.V
 Albatros L 25 C.X
 Albatros L 26 C.XI (Project)
 Albatros L 27 C.XII
 Albatros L 28 D.VI
 Albatros L 29 C.XIII
 Albatros L 30 B.IIa
 Albatros L 31 C.XIV
 Albatros L 32 C.Ia
 Albatros L 33 C.Ib
 Albatros L 34 D.VII
 Albatros L 35 D.VIII
 Albatros L 36 Dr.I
 Albatros L 37 D.IX	
 Albatros L 38 D.X
 Albatros L 39 Dr.II
 Albatros L 40 J.I	
 Albatros L 41 D.XI		
 Albatros L 42 J.II		
 Albatros L 43 D.XII	
 Albatros L 44 D.XIII
 Albatros L 45 D.XIIIa			
 Albatros L 46 D.XIV	
 Albatros L 47 C.XV
 Albatros L 48 J.III
 Albatros L 49 DA 1
 Albatros L 50 G.IV (Project)		
 Albatros L 51 C.If		
 Albatros L 52 C.Ifd
 Albatros L 53 CLS.I
 Albatros L 54 F.1
 Albatros L 55 D.XV Project
 Albatros L 56 Project
 Albatros L 57
 Albatros L 58
 Albatros L 59
 Albatros L 60
 Albatros L 61?
 Albatros L 62?
 Albatros L 63?
 Albatros L 64?
 Albatros L 65
 Albatros L 66
 Albatros L 66a	
 Albatros L 67
 Albatros L 68
 Albatros L 69
 Albatros L 70
 Albatros L 71
 Albatros L 72
 Albatros L 73	
 Albatros L 74	
 Albatros L 75
 Albatros L 76
 Albatros L 77v
 Albatros L 78
 Albatros L 79
 Albatros L 80? 	
 Albatros L 81
 Albatros L 82
 Albatros L 83
 Albatros L 84
 Albatros L 85?	 	
 Albatros L 86?	 	
 Albatros L 87?	 	
 Albatros L 88?	 	
 Albatros L 89?	  	
 Albatros L 90?	 	
 Albatros L 91?	 	
 Albatros L 92?
 Albatros L 93?	 	
 Albatros L 94?	
 Albatros L 95?	 	
 Albatros L 96?	
 Albatros L 97?
 Albatros L 98?	
 Albatros L 99?	
 Albatros L 100 10? a.k.a. Albatros Al 100
 Albatros L 101 a.k.a. Albatros Al 101
 Albatros L 102 a.k.a. Albatros Al 102 / Fw 55	
 Albatros L 103 a.k.a. Albatros Al 103
 Albatros AlKA
 Albatros DA 1
 Albatros DDK
 Albatros DE
 Albatros EE (Taube)
 Albatros LDD
 Albatros DM 15 C.I / L.6
 Albatros ME
 Albatros MZ.1
 Albatros MZ.2
 Albatros LDD
 Albatros LDDM
 Albatros VT
 Albatros F.1
 Albatros F.2
 Albatros N.I
 Albatros W.1
 Albatros W.2
 Albatros W.3
 Albatros W.4
 Albatros WD 3
 Albatros WMZ
 Albatros WMZ.2
 Albatros flugboat

 Albatros OAW 

(Ostdeutsche Albatroswerke G.m.b.H.)
 Albatros (OAW) C.I (Phönix 20.02)
 Albatros (OAW) C.II
 Albatros G.I (Albatros L4)

Albatross
(Albatross Scientific-Technical Works - Tsentr Nauchno-Teknhnichesgo Tvorchestva Albatross)
 Albatross AS-2
 Albatross AS-3A
 Albatross Sigma-4 (Elitar Sigma)

 Albaviation
 Albaviation D24 MagicOne

Albert

(Edouard Albert)Data from:
 Albert TE.1
 Albert TE.2
 Albert A-10
 Albert A-11S
 Albert A-20
 Albert A-60
 Albert A-61
 Albert A-62
 Albert A-120R
 Albert 140

Albert

(Jean Albert)
 Albert 1910 Monoplane

Albessard

(Joseph Albessard)
 Albessard Aérobus
 Albessard Triavion

Albrecht 
(Bemer E & James E Albrecht, Anderson, IN)
 Albrecht Monoplane

Albree
(George N. Albree)
 Albree Pigeon-Fraser Scout

ALCA
 ALCA-2

Alcock

 Alcock A.1 Scout

Alcor 

(Alcor (Allan Lockheed Corp) Aircraft Corp)
 Alcor C-6-1 Junior
 Alcor Olympic Duo-4
 Alcor Olympic Duo-6

Alder & Derryberry 

(W C Alder & L E Derryberry, Abilene, TX)
 Alder & Derryberry A

Alderson 

(F T Alderson, El Centro, CA)
 Alderson A-1

Alekseyev 

(Semyon Alexeyev - Alekseyev Design Bureau - OKB-21)
 Alekseyev I-21
 Alekseyev I-210
 Alekseyev I-211
 Alekseyev I-211S
 Alekseyev I-212
 Alekseyev I-213
 Alekseyev I-214
 Alekseyev I-215
 Alekseyev I-216
 Alekseyev I-217
 Alekseyev I-218 (unverified: - 218 or I-218?)
 Alekseyev I-219
 Alekseyev I-220
 Alekseyev I-221

Alenia 

See also: Fiat, Aeritalia, AMX International
 Alenia C-27 Spartan

Alexander 

(Alexander Aircraft Co)
 Alexander B-1
 Alexander Bullet
 Alexander Eaglerock
 Alexander Eaglerock A
 Alexander Eaglerock Combo-Wing
 Alexander Eaglerock Short-Wing
 Alexander Eaglerock Long-Wing
 Alexander Flyabout D
 Alexander Longren
 Alexander Hallett
 Alexander Racer
 Alexander Sedan
 Alexander Cabin Cruiser
 Alexander Swallow

Alexandria 

(Alexandria Aircraft Co)
 Alexandria 10
 Alexandria F-19
 Briggs F-19

Alfaro 

(Heraclio Alfaro (Vitoriano Heraclio Alfaro-Fournier))
 Alfaro I 1913
 Alfaro 1914 (Spain)
 Alfaro Autogyro
 Alfaro X-13
 Ingalls Safety Airplane
 Alfaro 8 (Hereter T.H.)

Algate 

(Algate Aircraft Corp)
 Algate 1

Ali Viberti
(Ali Viberti S.p.a. / Franco Muscariello)
 Ali Viberti Musca I

Alisport 

(Alisport srl, Cremella, Italy)
 Alisport Yuma
 Alisport Silent 2 Electro
 Alisport Silent Club
 Alisport Silent 2
 Alisport Silent 2 Targa

Alkan 

(Oscar Alkan)
 Alkan le Enfin

Alker 

 Alker Sport

All American

(All-American Aircraft Inc)
 All American 10-A Ensign

Allard 

 Allard D.40

Allen 

(Edmund T Allen, Salt Lake City, UT)
 Allen 1928 Biplane
 Allen A-4

Allen 

(A J Allen, Savannah, GA)
 Allen A-2
 Allen A-3

Allen 

(Frank Allen, 6040 Dorchester Ave, Chicago, IL)
 Allen DLX Special
 Newhall Racer

Allenbaugh 

(Edward Allenbaugh, North Hollywood, CA)
 Allenbaugh 1947 9Racer
 Allenbaugh A
 Allenbaugh B
 Allenbaugh Special

Alliance

(Alliance Aircraft Company Ltd.)
 Alliance P.1
 Alliance P.2 Seabird

Alliance

(Alliance Aircraft Corp, North Webb St, Alliance, OH)
 Alliance A-1 Argo

Alliance 

 Alliance X

Alliant 

 Alliant RQ-6 Outrider

Allied 

(Allied Aircraft Corp, North Tonawanda, NY)
 Allied Sport Trainer

Allied 

(Allied Aircraft Corp (pres: J A Phillips), Wichita, KS)
 Allied A-2

Allied

 Allied Aviation LRA
 Allied Aviation LR2A
 Allied Aviation Trimmer

Alliet-Larivière

 Alliet-Larivière Allar 4
 Alliet-Larivière AL-06 Frégate

Allinio 

(Peter Allinio, 409 Kearney St, El Cerrito, CA)
 Allinio 1916 Biplane
 Allinio Bristol Cabin

Allison 

((Lawrence M) Allison Airplane Co)
 Allison Alco
 Allison Alco Sport
 Allison Junior Coupe
 Allison Coupster
 Allison MT-3 Utility
 Allison Sport
 Allison Utility
 Allison Junior
 Allison Sportford
 Allison Trainer

Allison

(Allison Gas Turbine Division GMC)
 Allison Turbine Bonanza
 Allison Turbine Mentor
 Allison Turbine ATF 580S Turbo Flagship

Allison-White 

((Lawrence M) Allison-(Karl H) White)
 Allison-White 1916 Biplane

Alon 

(Alon Inc (founders: John Allen Jr & Lee O Higdon), McPherson, KS)
 Alon A-2 Aircoupe
 Alon A-4

Alpaero 

(ALPAERO Noin Aéronautique, Châteauvieux, France)
 Alpaero Choucas
 Alpaero Exel
 Alpaero Sirius

Alpavia

(Societe Alpavia)
 Alpavia RF-3

Alpha 

(Alpha Aviation Co)
 Alpha 11D

Alpha Aviation

(Alpha Aviation (New Zealand))
 Alpha 120T
 Alpha 160A
 Alpha 160Ai

Alpi Aviation

(Alpi Aviation srl, Pordenone, Italy)
Alpi Pioneer 200
Alpi Pioneer 230
Alpi Pioneer 300
Alpi Pioneer 300 Kite
Alpi Pioneer 330
Alpi Pioneer 400
Syton AH 130

Alpla

(Alpla-Werke Alwin Lehner GmbH & Co KG)
 Alpla Samburo

Altair Coelho

(Eldorado do Sul, Brazil)
Altair Coelho AC-1
Altair Coelho AC-11

Alter

(Ludwig Alter Werke)
 Alter Type AI

Altitude Group

(Altitude Group, LLC, Overland Park, KS)
Altitude Radial Rocket

Alvarez 

(Joseph Alvarez, Chino, CA)
 Alvarez Polliwagen

Alvarez et de Condé 

 Alvarez et de Condé No.1
 Alvarez et de Condé No.2
 Alvarez et de Condé No.3

AM

(Arts et Métiers ParisTech)
 AM-69 Georges Payre

AMA 

(Aircraft Mechanics Association)
 AMA Minx Capon

AMA
(Anczutin-Malinowski-Aleksandrowicz Andrzej Anczutin, Henryk Malinowski and Rościslaw Aleksandrowicz)
 AMA motor glider

Amax Engineering

(Donvale, Victoria, Australia)
Amax Double Eagle TT
Amax Eagle
Amax Eagle TT
Amax J-6 Karatoo
Amax Sport 1700
Amax Vixen 105

Ambi-Budd 

 Ambi-Budd Flying Car - 1930s concept car

Ambrosini

(Societa Aeronautica Italiana Ing. A. Ambrosini & C.)
 Ambrosini F.4 Rondone
 Ambrosini F.7 Rondone II
 Ambrosini P.512
 Ambrosini S.7
 Ambrosini S.1001 Grifo
 Ambrosini S.1002
 Ambrosini SAI.1
 Ambrosini SAI.2
 Ambrosini SAI.2S
 Ambrosini SAI.3
 Ambrosini SAI.7
 Ambrosini SAI.10
 Ambrosini SAI.11
 Ambrosini SAI.107
 Ambrosini SAI.207
 Ambrosini SAI.403 Dardo
 Ambrosini Sagittario
 Ambrosini SS.4
 Ambrosini Super S.7
 Ambrosini AR "flying bomb".

AMC 

 AMC 1919 Multiplane

AMD 

(Aircraft Manufacturing and Development, Eastman, GA)
 AMD Zodiac CH 640
 AMD Alarus CH2000
 SAMA CH2000 (military CH2000)

AME
(Aeronautica Militar Espanola)
 AME VI
 AME VIA

AmEagle

 AmEagle American Eaglet

American 

(American Aeroplane Supply House, 266-68 Franklin St, Hempstead, NY)
 American Bleriot XI
 American X-15

American Air Jet 

 American Air Jet American

American Air Racing 

(American Air Racing Ltd.)
 American Air Racing Special

American Air Racing 

(American Air Racing Inc (pres: John Parker), Rancho Palos Verdes, CA)
 Parker JP001
 Parker JP-350

American Aircraft 

 American Aircraft S-1B

American Aerolights 

 American Aerolights Double Eagle
 American Aerolights Eagle
 American Aerolights Falcon

American Airmotive 

(American Airmotive Corp (pres: John D MacArthur), Miami, FL)
 American Airmotive NA-75

American Autogyro

 American Autogyro Sparrowhawk

American Aviation

(American Aviation Corp, (Delaware incorporation), New York, NY)
 American Aviation AA-1 Yankee
 American Aviation AA-1A Trainer
 American Aviation AA-2 Patriot
 American Aviation AA-5 Traveler

American Champion 

((American Champion Aircraft Corp (pres: Jerry Mehlhaff), Rochester, WI))
 American Champion 7EC Champ
 American Champion 7ECA Citabria Aurora
 American Champion 7GCAA Citabria Adventure
 American Champion 7GCBC Citabria Explorer
 American Champion 8GCBC Scout
 American Champion Scout CS
 American Champion 8KCAB Super Decathlon

American Eagle

(American Eagle Aircraft Corp, (Victor H) Roos Lincoln Aircraft Co)
 American Eagle A-1
 American Eagle A-101
 American Eagle A-129
 American Eagle A-139
 American Eagle A-229
 American Eagle A-251 Phaeton
 American Eagle A-329
 American Eagle A-429
 American Eagle A-430
 American Eagle A-529
 American Eagle A-629
 American Eagle D-430
 American Eagle E-430
 American Eagle 201
 American Eagle 330
 American Eagle Eaglet 31
 American Eagle Eaglet 130
 American Eagle Eaglet 230
 American Eagle Eaglet 231
 American Eagle Eaglet A-31
 American Eagle Eaglet B-31
 American Eagle Eaglet B-32
 American Eagle Flyabout

American Eaglecraft 

(American Eaglecraft Co, Fort Worth & Grapevine, TX)
 Eaglet A-31-B
 Eaglet B-31

American Electric 

 American Electric Piranha

American Flea 

(American Mignet Aircraft Corp.)
 American Flea HM-20
 American Flea HM-21
 American Flea HM-23
 American Flea TC-1

American General Aviation Corporation

 American General AG-5B Tiger

American Gyro 

(American Gyro Co, Denver, CO)
 American Gyro AG-4 Crusader
 American Gyro AG-6 Buccaner
 American Gyro AG-7

American Helicopter

(American Helicopter Co., a division of Fairchild Aircraft)
 American Helicopter A-5 Top Sergeant
 American Helicopter A-6 Buck Private
 American Helicopter XH-26 Jet Jeep
 American Helicopter A-8
 American Helicopter Transporter (with Fairchild)

American Homebuilts

(Hebron, Illinois)
American Homebuilts John Doe

American Jet Industries
 American Jet Industries T-610 Super Cobra

American Legend 

(American Legend Aircraft Co)
 American Legend AL3C-100 Cub
 American Legend AL11C-100
 American Legend AL11J-120
 American Legend Super Legend
 American Legend Texas Sport Cub
 American Legend MOAC

American Moth 

(Vulcan Aircraft Co,)
 Vulcan V-1
 Vulcan V-3

American Patriot Aircraft

(American Patriot Aircraft LLC, Westfield, WI)
American Patriot Supercruiser

American Sportscopter 

(Newport News, VA)
 American Sportscopter Ultrasport 254
 American Sportscopter Ultrasport 331
 American Sportscopter Ultrasport 496

American Sunbeam 

(American Sunbeam Aircraft Ltd)
 American Sunbeam LP-1 Pup

American Utilicraft Corp.

 Utilicraft FF-1080

AmeriPlanes 
 AmeriPlanes Mitchell Wing A-10

Ames 

(Butler Ames, Washington, DC)
 Ames 1908 Drum wing experimental

Ames 

(William P Ames)
 Ames Parasol

Ames-Dryden

(Ames Industrial Co)
 Ames-Dryden AD-1 Oblique Wing

Ameur 

(Ameur Aviation Technologie / AAT)
 AAT Balbzard
 Ameur Altania
 Ameur Altania RG 80 UL
 Ameur Altania Vista
 Ameur Inguidar
 Ameur Altania Saphir
 Ameur UAV MALE
 Ameur Altajet

AMF Microflight 

(AMF Aviation Enterprises, Aviation Enterprises)
 AMF Chevvron 2-32C
 AMF Super Chevvron 2-45CS
 AMF Sea Chevvron 2-48
 AMF Aviation Enterprises Magnum

Amicale d'Aviation Légère 

 Amicale d'Aviation Légère 04

Amiot 
(SECM-Amiot - Société d'Emboutissage et de Constructions Mécaniques / Félix Amiot)
 SECM 10 BN.2
 SECM 12 BN.2
 SECM 20
 SECM 22
 SECM 23
 SECM 24
 Amiot 01
 Amiot 110
 Amiot 120
 Amiot 122
 Amiot 123
 Amiot 124
 Amiot 125
 Amiot 130
 Amiot 140
 Amiot 141M
 Amiot 142
 Amiot 143M
 Amiot 144
 Amiot 150
 Amiot 340
 Amiot 341
 Amiot 350
 Amiot 351
 Amiot 352
 Amiot 353
 Amiot 354
 Amiot 355
 Amiot 356
 Amiot 357
 Amiot 358
 Amiot 370
 Amiot AAC.1 Tucan

Ampaire
Ampaire Electric EEL

Amphibians 
 Amphibians Privateer

AMS-Flight

(AMS-Flight, Ljubljana)
 AMS Carat

Amsco

 Amsco parasol monoplane

AMV 

(AMV Aircraft (fdr: Attila Melkuti), Aliso Viejo, CA)
 AMV 211

AMX 

 AMX International AMX

References

Further reading

External links

 List of aircraft (Ai)